The voiceless pharyngeal fricative is a type of consonantal sound, used in some spoken languages. The symbol in the International Phonetic Alphabet that represents this sound is an h-bar, and the equivalent X-SAMPA symbol is X\. In the transcription of Arabic, Berber (and other Afro-Asiatic languages) as well as a few other scripts, it is often written , .

Typically characterized as a fricative in the upper pharynx, it is often characterized as a whispered [h].

Features
Features of the voiceless pharyngeal fricative:

Occurrence
This sound is the most commonly cited realization of the Semitic letter hēth, which occurs in all dialects of Arabic, Classical Syriac, as well as Biblical and Tiberian Hebrew but only a minority of speakers of Modern Hebrew. It has also been reconstructed as appearing in Ancient Egyptian, a related Afro-Asiatic language. Modern non-Oriental Hebrew has merged the voiceless pharyngeal fricative with the voiceless velar (or uvular) fricative. However, phonetic studies have shown that the so-called voiceless pharyngeal fricatives of Semitic languages are often neither pharyngeal (but rather epiglottal) nor fricatives (but rather approximants).

See also
 Pharyngeal fricative
 Heth
 Index of phonetics articles
 Guttural
 H with stroke

Notes

References

External links
 

Fricative consonants
Pharyngeal consonants
Pulmonic consonants
Voiceless oral consonants
Maltese language